The 1990 UCI Track Cycling World Championships were the World Championship for track cycling. They took place in Maebashi, Japan in August 1990. Fifteen events were contested, 12 for men (5 for professionals, 7 for amateurs) and 3 for women.

Medal summary

Medal table

References

Uci Track Cycling World Championships, 1990
Track cycling
UCI Track Cycling World Championships by year
International cycle races hosted by Japan